Mary Forbes, Countess of Granard (c.1677 – 4 October 1765), formerly the Hon. Mary Stewart, was the wife of George Forbes, 3rd Earl of Granard. She was born in Ireland, the daughter of William Stewart, 1st Viscount Mountjoy, and his wife, the former Mary Coote.

Mary Stewart's first husband was Phineas Preston of Ardsallagh, County Meath; they married in 1692 and had four children:

Jane Preston (c.1693 – 12 November 1746), who married Alexander Breckenridge and had children; they emigrated to North America.
Mary Preston (1696–1749), who married Phillip Barger and also emigrated to North America.
Colonel John Preston (1699–1747), who married Elizabeth Patten and had children; they also emigrated to North America. 
Nathaniel Preston (born c.1700)

Following Phineas Preston's death, Mary married Forbes in 1709, when he was a naval officer. They had three children:
Lady Mary Forbes (died 27 November 1797), who married James Irvine of Kingcaussie
Lt.-Gen. George Forbes, 4th Earl of Granard (15 March 1710 – 16 Oct 1769)
Admiral Hon. John Forbes (1714 – 10 March 1796), who married Lady Mary Capell and was the father of Maria Villiers, Countess of Clarendon, and Katherine Wellesley-Pole, Countess of Mornington.

In 1726, Forbes was raised to the Irish peerage as Lord Forbes. As a diplomat, Lord Forbes spent some time in Russia in 1733-34. He became Earl of Granard on the death of his father in 1734. Their family home was Castle Forbes, in Longford, Ireland.

She died a few months after her husband, aged around 88.

References

1670s births
1765 deaths
Irish countesses
Daughters of viscounts